César Antonio Díaz Escobar (born 20 June 1975) is a Chilean retired footballer who played as a forward and current manager.

Playing career
Born in Santiago, Díaz played for 11 clubs during a 17-year professional career. He started out at Club Deportivo Palestino in 1994, moving to Cobreloa after four seasons.

Díaz went on to represent, in his country's top division but also in the second, Audax Italiano, Santiago Morning, Coquimbo Unido, Deportes Temuco, Santiago Wanderers, Cobresal, Deportes Melipilla, Curicó Unido and Deportes Antofagasta, retiring at the age of 36. He scored his last goal on 4 September 2011 in a 5–0 away win against Deportes Copiapó and, in 2005, was crowned joint-top scorer to help Cobresal to the sixth overall position.

Coaching career

Honours

Individual
Primera División de Chile Top Scorer: 2005 Clausura

References

External links

1975 births
Living people
Footballers from Santiago
Chilean footballers
Association football forwards
Chilean Primera División players
Primera B de Chile players
Club Deportivo Palestino footballers
Cobreloa footballers
Audax Italiano footballers
Santiago Morning footballers
Coquimbo Unido footballers
Deportes Temuco footballers
Santiago Wanderers footballers
Cobresal footballers
Deportes Melipilla footballers
Curicó Unido footballers
C.D. Antofagasta footballers
Chilean football managers